Terry M. Mercer (born May 6, 1947) is a former Canadian Senator.

A long-time fundraiser and organizer for the Liberal Party of Canada, Mercer was appointed to the Senate representing Nova Scotia by Prime Minister Jean Chrétien in November 2003, shortly before Prime Minister Chrétien's retirement. Mercer served as National Director of the Liberal Party during much of Chrétien's tenure as party leader.

Mercer has been an administrator and fundraiser for numerous charitable organizations such as the Kidney Foundation of Canada, St. John Ambulance, the Nova Scotia Lung Association, the YMCA and the Canadian Diabetes Association and is currently Past Chair of the Association of Fundraising Professionals' Foundation for Philanthropy in Canada.

Prior to entering the charitable sector,  Mercer worked as Executive Assistant to Nova Scotia's Minister of Labour and Housing from 1974 to 1978.

In February 2013, Mercer became a subject of criticism for having spent the most out of any senator in the past year.

On January 29, 2014, Liberal Party leader Justin Trudeau announced all Liberal Senators, including Mercer, were removed from the Liberal caucus, and would continue sitting as Independents. The senators refer to themselves as the Senate Liberal Caucus even though they are no longer members of the parliamentary Liberal caucus.

With the Senate Liberal Caucus facing losing official parliamentary caucus status in 2020 with a third of its caucus facing mandatory retirements on their turning age 75, Senator Joseph Day announced that the Senate Liberal Caucus had been dissolved and a new Progressive Senate Group formed in its wake, with the entire membership joining the new group, including this senator.

With Senator Day's mandatory retirement in January 2020, on December 12, 2019, Senator Jane Cordy tweeted that her colleagues in the PSG had selected her as the new leader, ostensibly effective that same date. Additionally, she subsequently announced later that day Senator Mercer would be moving into the Whip/Caucus Chair role, that Senator  would become the new Deputy Leader, and that the interim monikers were being removed at the same time. Senator Mercer retired on May 6, 2022, upon reaching the age of 75, as required by the constitution.

References

External links
 
 Liberal Senate Forum

1947 births
Living people
Liberal Party of Canada senators
Senate Liberal Caucus
Progressive Senate Group
Canadian senators from Nova Scotia
21st-century Canadian politicians